Engelbert Broda (29 August 1910, in Vienna – 26 October 1983, in Hainburg an der Donau) was an Austrian chemist and physicist suspected by some to have been a KGB spy code-named Eric, who could have been a main Soviet source of information on British and American nuclear research.

Early life 
Broda was born in 1910 as the first son of Viola and Ernst Broda, a Viennese lawyer. His brother Christian was later to become Minister of Justice in Austria. Broda was strongly influenced by his uncle Georg Wilhelm Pabst, a famous film director, and Egon Schönhof, who returned to Austria as a convinced communist after serving time as a prisoner-of-war in Russia. While he studied at the University of Vienna, Broda took part in the communist resistance against the National Socialists. During that period, he was imprisoned several times because of his political activities. Broda emigrated to the United Kingdom in 1938.

Scientific career 
Broda had his Ph.D. in Chemistry approved in 1934 at the University of Vienna. From 1940 he worked at the Medical Research Council at the University College London, researching the transformation of light into chemical energy. From 1941 he worked at the Cavendish Laboratory, on radioactivity and nuclear fission. At this time he made intensive studies of the work of Ludwig Boltzmann.

In 1947 he returned to the University of Vienna. From 1955 until 1980 he served as Professor for Physical chemistry. His major work as a scientist - Evolution of the Bioenergetic Processes - was published in 1975.

Political initiatives 
Broda became a member of the Pugwash movement, in support of nuclear disarmament. He also worked to propagate the use of solar energy, and in 1979 he was awarded the Austrian Award for the Protection of Nature, for his initiatives concerning a projected power plant in Dürnstein, Wachau. He was given an honorary funeral at the Zentralfriedhof in Vienna.

Alleged espionage 
In 2009 Broda was accused of espionage in a book based upon the journalist Alexander Vassiliev's access to formerly undisclosed KGB archives. According to the book, KGB reports from August 1943 suggest that Broda ("Eric") was the main Soviet source of information on British and American nuclear research at this early time. MI5 had suspected he was Alan Nunn May's recruiter, but did not have conclusive proof.

Works 

 Kräfte des Weltalls (Forces of the universe), Globus, Vienna 1954 (an introduction for non-specialists about phenomenons of astronomy, radiation, palaeogeography, raw materials, the basic structures of chemical substances, and fundamental principles of life)
 Ludwig Boltzmann. Mensch, Physiker, Philosoph, 1955
 Atomkraft - Furcht und Hoffnung, 1956
 The Evolution of the Bioenergetic Processes, 1975 
 Wissenschaft, Verantwortung, Frieden, 1985

Further reading

 "Spies, the Rise and Fall of the KGB in America" , John Earl Haynes, Harvey Klehr and Alexander Vassiliew
Scientist Spies by Paul Broda (2011)

References

External links 
 Engelbert Broda, extensive resource (Austrian Central Library for Physics and Chemistry Library). 
 

Austrian physical chemists
Austrian nuclear physicists
Cold War spies
Nuclear weapons program of the Soviet Union
Nuclear secrecy
Austrian spies for the Soviet Union
Scientists from Vienna
1910 births
1983 deaths
Members of the German Academy of Sciences at Berlin